Dongeradeel is a former municipality in the northern Netherlands. In 2019 it merged with the municipalities of Ferwerderadiel and Kollumerland en Nieuwkruisland to form the new municipality Noardeast-Fryslân.

History 
Dongeradeel was created in 1984 from the merging of the old municipalities Westdongeradeel, Oostdongeradeel, and Dokkum.

Population centres 
Aalsum, Anjum, Bornwird, Brantgum, Dokkum, Ee, Engwierum, Foudgum, Hantum, Hantumeruitburen, Hantumhuizen, Hiaure, Holwerd, Jouswier, Lioessens, Metslawier, Moddergat, Morra, Nes, Niawier, Oosternijkerk, Oostmahorn, Oostrum, Paesens, Raard, Ternaard, Waaxens, Wetsens, Wierum.

Topography

Dutch Topographic map of the municipality of Dongeradeel, June 2015.

Notable people 

 Ritske Jelmera (1383 in Ternaard - 1450) a Frisian chieftain who ruled the island of Ameland
 Johannes Phocylides Holwarda (1618 in Holwerd — 1651) a Frisian astronomer, physician, philosopher and academic
 Hans Willem van Aylva (ca.1633 in Holwerd - 1691) a Dutch soldier
 Balthasar Bekker (1634 in Metslawier – 1698) a Dutch minister and author of philosophical and theological works opposing superstition
 Nienke van Hichtum (1860 in Nes, Dongeradeel – 1939) a Frisian Dutch children's author
 Willem van der Woude (1876 in Oosternijkerk – 1974) a Dutch mathematician and academic
 Meindert DeJong (1906 in Wierum – 1991) a Dutch-born American writer of children's books
 Lou Dijkstra (1909 in Paesens – 1964) a Dutch speed skater, competed in the 1936 Winter Olympics 
 Theo Hiddema (born 1944 in Holwerd) a Dutch lawyer, media personality and politician
 Sybe I. Rispens (born 1969 in Dokkum) a Dutch writer, scientist and entrepreneur

References

External links

Noardeast-Fryslân
Former municipalities of Friesland
1984 establishments in the Netherlands
States and territories established in 1984
Municipalities of the Netherlands disestablished in 2019